Māris Putenis (born 20 June 1982) is a Latvian racewalker. He competed in the men's 20 kilometres walk at the 2000 Summer Olympics.

References

1982 births
Living people
Athletes (track and field) at the 2000 Summer Olympics
Latvian male racewalkers
Olympic athletes of Latvia
Place of birth missing (living people)